Zgornja Pristava (in older sources Zgornja Pristova) is a settlement in the Municipality of Slovenske Konjice in eastern Slovenia. It lies south and west of Slovenske Konjice and its territory extends up to Deer Peak on Mount Konjice. The area is part of the traditional region of Styria. The municipality is now included in the Savinja Statistical Region.

Name
The name Zgornja Pristava literally means 'upper manor farm'. The name Pristava comes from the common noun pristava 'manor farm; house with outbuildings and land'. Manor farms were typically found near a manor house or castle and were operated by its servants. Settlements with this name and the semantically equivalent Marof are frequent in Slovenia.

Mass grave
Zgornja Pristava is the site of a mass grave from the period immediately after the Second World War. The Trebnik Manor Mass Grave lies on a slope southwest of Slovenske Konjice near an electric power line. It contains the remains of 30 to 40 Slovene civilians from Slovenske Konjice that were murdered in May or June 1945.

Konjice Castle

The ruins of Konjice Castle lie on the slopes of Mount Konjice south of the settlement. It was an extensive castle built in the 12th century and abandoned in the 18th century.

Notable people
Notable people that were born or lived in Zgornja Pristave include the following:
Anton Vogrinec (1873–1947), Roman Catholic priest, author and reform-minded theologian

References

External links
Zgornja Pristava at Geopedia

Populated places in the Municipality of Slovenske Konjice